Bartoszewicz is a Polish surname. Notable people with the surname include:

 Artur Bartoszewicz (born 1974), Polish economist
 Elżbieta Grabarek-Bartoszewicz, Chairpersons of the City Council of Gdańsk 1998–2001
 Julian Bartoszewicz (1821–1870), Polish historian
 Kazimierz Bartoszewicz (1852–1930), Polish writer and historian
 Kaziuk Bartoszewicz, Konopielka character
 Myrtle Bartoszewicz, Woody Herman mother
 Tomasz Bartoszewicz, Central Customs Office executive of Tax and Customs Service (Poland)
 Władysław Bartoszewicz, Powszechny Zakład Ubezpieczeń CEO
 Włodzimierz Bartoszewicz (1899–1983), Polish painter

See also 
 Bartosiewicz

Polish-language surnames